Cryptophasa chionotarsa is a moth in the family Xyloryctidae. It was described by Edward Meyrick in 1925. It is found on New Guinea.

The wingspan is 42–43 mm. The forewings are rather dark fuscous, on the dorsal half with a few scattered white scales and with a rather thick attenuated suffused dark fuscous dorsal streak. There is an obscure suffused dark fuscous transverse spot on the end of the cell and a patch of white speckling before the termen. The hindwings are grey.

References

Cryptophasa
Moths described in 1925